The .510 Whisper is a subsonic rifle cartridge developed by SSK Industries for use in suppressed rifles.

Overview
The .510 Whisper (13×47 mm) is the second of two 1/2 inch caliber rounds developed by J. D. Jones with a specific focus on the Thumper concept and subsonic use. Based on the .416 Rigby case, it is a non-belted and bottlenecked cartridge.

Earlier J. D. Jones had already developed the similar .500 Whisper round, which has a roughly 0.4 inch (10 mm) longer belted bottlenecked case based on the .378 Weatherby Magnum.

Despite the large bullet, this round is very quiet when using a suppressor due to the subsonic nature of the cartridge. When used with a very high ballistic coefficient bullet, the round only loses about  out to over 500 yards. This gives it more downrange energy at that distance than traditional .30 caliber rounds such as the .308 Winchester and .300 Winchester Magnum. Sako TRG-S test rifles have achieved minute of angle, and better, accuracy with this cartridge at 600 yards.

Powders such as H110, 4227, or surplus WC820 are well suited for subsonic loads and give a low standard deviation. Necessary components such as barrels, reloading dies, etc. are available from SSK.  Sako TRG-S actions are most often converted to this caliber.  The Thompson Center Encore is also suitable, but is rather lightweight for shooting this heavy recoiling cartridge, especially when using  bullets.

Design
The case of the .510 Whisper is based on the .416 Rigby (same as the .338 Lapua Magnum) as the parent case.

See also
Whisper Family of Firearm Cartridges
12.7×55mm STs-130
12 mm caliber
Glossary of firearms terminology
List of rifle cartridges

References

Pistol and rifle cartridges
Whisper cartridges
Subsonic rifle cartridges